The Casa del Corregidor is a building located in the town of Marbella, southern Spain.

It was built in 1552, with a stone facade emblazoned with a balcony backed by three arches, combining Gothic and Renaissance elements. The Moorish-style ceiling contains fresco murals.

References
Marbella City Council

Houses completed in 1552
Buildings and structures in Marbella
1552 establishments in Spain